Another Level may refer to:

Another Level (band), an English soul and R&B influenced boy band
Another Level (Another Level album), 1998
Another Level (Blackstreet album), 1996
"Another Level", a song by Alb featuring MC Soom-T from A Bugged Out Mix
Another Level, an album by Luther Barnes & The Sunset Jubilaires